Shajapur is a town in Malwa region of Madhya Pradesh state in west-central India. It is the headquarters of Shajapur district.

Geography
The highest peak is known as Bhairo Dungri.

Climate

Demographics
 India census, Shajapur district had a population of 1,290,685, with 669,852 males and 620,833 females.

In popular media 
In the opening scenes of the popular yesteryears Hindi film, Shree 420, the protagonist (Raj Kapoor) finds a road crossing showing the direction to three places, of which one is Shajapur. The other two are Dewas and Bombay.

References